The Termoli-Campobasso railway line is a secondary railway line in Molise, Italy.

It connects the region's capital town, Campobasso, to the coast of Molise (on the Adriatic sea), through the Termoli railway station, where it connects to the Adriatic railway (Bologna-Taranto).

At Campobasso, the railway networks provides connections to Venafro, via the Campobasso-Venafro railway, which connects the province of Campobasso with the neighbouring province of Isernia - the two province of Molise region.

The two railway lines, together, form the Termoli-Venafro railway.

The Termoli-Campobasso railway passes through 15 stations, of which at present only 8 are active; the others are abandoned or closed to passenger service.

History
The line was provided by the Baccarini Law.

On December 15, 2001, Castellino sul Biferno station, Piane di Larino station and Ripalimosani railway station had been abolished for a long time no longer active.

On December 9, 2016, the service was suspended and replaced with bus. Service on the line was reinstated in August 2020.

Path      - Inauguration 
Termoli-Larino March 12, 1882
Larino-Casacalenda January 21, 1883
Casacalenda-Campobasso October 21, 1883

Stations List

Bibliography

See also

Termoli–Venafro railway
History of rail transport in Italy
List of railway stations in Molise
Rail transport in Italy
Railway stations in Italy

External links
History and pictures of Molise railway stations 

Railway lines in Molise
Railway lines opened in 1882
Railway lines opened in 1883